Randall Williams may refer to:

Randall L. Williams Correctional Facility, a prison in Arkansas
Randall Williams (showman) (1846–1898), British showman
Randall Williams (politician), South African politician and attorney
Randall W. Williams, physician and state health director

See also
Randell Williams (born 1996), English footballer
Caroline Randall Williams (born 1987), American writer and cook